Nawab Saadat Yaar Khan Rangin 
(1757, Sirhind – 1835, Lucknow) was an Urdu poet and prose writer. He is credited with the creating a feminist form of Urdu poetry known as "Rekhti".

Background
He was born in Sirhind, brought up Delhi, and died in Lucknow. He was the son of Tahmas Khan Beg, a Persian noble.

Career
He was a disciple of Shah Hatim. The four collections of his poems are – Rekhta, Baqiyaa, Aamekhta and Angekhta in which he is seen as a romantic poet whose choice of words was high. He wrote poems describing his amours with courtesans and dancing girls. He also wrote Majalis e Rangin, a critical review of contemporary Urdu poets. Rangin was a mercenary, a horse-trader and a poet.

References

Urdu-language poets from India
Muslim poets
19th-century Indian Muslims
Indian male poets
1757 births
1835 deaths
Poets from Delhi
18th-century Indian poets
19th-century Indian poets
19th-century Indian male writers
18th-century male writers